This page lists notable faculty (past and present) of the University of California, Berkeley. Faculty who were also alumni are listed in bold font, with degree and year in parentheses.

By award

Nobel laureates

Turing Award

Academy Award

Fields Medal

Pulitzer Prize

Wolf Prize 
{{columns-list|colwidth=20em|
 Paul Alivisatos (Ph.D. 1986) – Professor of Chemistry and Materials Science and Professor of Nanotechnology; recipient of the 2012 Wolf Prize in Chemistry, for the development of "the colloidal inorganic nanocrystal as a building block of nanoscience making fundamental contributions to controlling the synthesis of these particles, to measuring and understanding their physical properties, and to utilizing their unique properties for applications ranging from light generation and harvesting to biological imaging"
 James P. Allison – professor at UC Berkeley (1985-2004); 2017 Wolf Prize in Medicine "for sparking a revolution in cancer therapy through (his) discovery of immune checkpoint blockade"
 Robert G. Bergman – professor of chemistry (1977–present) at UC Berkeley; 2017 Wolf Prize in Chemistry "for the discovery of the activation of C-H bonds of hydrocarbons by soluble transition metal complexes"
 Carolyn R. Bertozzi (Ph.D. 1993)  – professor of chemistry (1996-2015); 2022 Wolf Prize in Chemistry for "seminal contributions to understanding the chemistry of cellular communication and inventing chemical methodologies to study the role of carbohydrates, lipids, and proteins in such biological processes"
 John Casida – recipient of the Wolf Prize (1993, Agriculture) "for his pioneering studies on the mode of action of insecticides, design of safer pesticides and contributions to the understanding of nerve and muscle function in insects"
 Shiing-Shen Chern – recipient of the Wolf Prize (1983, Mathematics), "for outstanding contributions to global differential geometry, which have profoundly influenced all mathematics"
 John Clauser – professor (1969-1996) of quantum physics at UC Berkeley, known for the Clauser-Horne-Shimony-Holt inequality and the first observations of quantum entanglement, recipient of the 2010 Wolf Prize in Physics for "fundamental conceptual and experimental contributions to the foundations of quantum physics, specifically an increasingly sophisticated series of tests of Bell's inequalities or extensions there of using entangled quantum states" Jennifer Doudna – Li Ka Shing Chancellor's Chair in Biomedical and Health Sciences, Professor of Molecular and Cell Biology, and Professor of Chemistry at Berkeley; recipient of the 2022 Wolf Prize in Chemistry, "for revealing the medicine-revolutionizing mechanism of bacterial immunity via RNA-guided genome editing"
 Phillip Griffiths (professor 1962-1967) – mathematician, recipient of the Wolf Prize (2008, Mathematics), "for his work on variations of Hodge structure; the theory of periods of abelian integrals; and for his contributions to complex differential geometry"; former professor at UC Berkeley
 Erwin Hahn – recipient of the Wolf Prize (1983/1984, Physics) "for his discovery of nuclear spin echoes and for the phenomenon of self-induced transparency"
 John F. Hartwig (Ph.D. 1990) – 2019 Wolf Prize in Chemistry "for the development of efficient transition-metal catalysts that have revolutionized drug manufacturing, leading to breakthroughs in molecule and synthetics design"; Henry Rapoport Professor of Chemistry at UC Berkeley (2011-present)
 Carl Huffaker – recipient of the Wolf Prize (1994/1995) for " contributions to the development and implementation of environmentally beneficial integrated pest management systems for the protection of agricultural crops"
 George C. Pimentel (Ph.D. 1949) – professor at UC Berkeley (1949–1989); inventor of the chemical laser;  Wolf Prize (Chemistry, 1982) "for development of matrix isolation spectroscopy and for the discovery of photodissociation lasers and chemical lasers" Alexander Pines – recipient of the Wolf Prize (Chemistry, 1991), "for his revolutionary contributions to NMR spectroscopy, especially multiple-quantum and high-spin NMR""
 Stanley B. Prusiner – Professor of Virology in Residence (1984-present), Nobel laureate (1997, Physiology or Medicine) "for his discovery of Prions, a new biological principle of infection" (known as the mechanism powering mad cow disease); recipient of the 1996 Wolf Prize in Medicine"for discovering prions, new class of pathogens that cause important neurodegenerative disease by inducing changes in protein structure" Peter G. Schultz – professor of chemistry (1985-1999) at UC Berkeley; 1994 Wolf Prize in Chemistry "for converting antibodies into enzymes, thus permitting the catalysis of chemical reactions considered impossible to achieve by classical chemical procedures" Stephen Smale – recipient of the Wolf Prize (2007, Mathematics)"for his groundbreaking contributions that have played a fundamental role in shaping differential topology, dynamical systems, mathematical economics, and other subjects in mathematics"
 Gabor Somorjai (Ph.D. 1960) – recipient of the 1998 Wolf Prize (Chemistry) for "outstanding contributions to the field of the surface science in general, and for... elucidation of fundamental mechanisms of heterogeneous catalytic reactions at single crystal surfaces in particular"
 Roger Y. Tsien – recipient of the Wolf Prize (Medicine, 2004) "for his seminal contribution to the design and biological application of novel fluorescent and photolabile molecules to analyze and perturb cell signal transduction" (also listed in Nobel laureates)
 Omar M. Yaghi – The James and Neeltje Tretter Professor of Chemistry (2012-present) and Senior Faculty Scientist at Lawrence Berkeley National Laboratory; recipient of the Wolf Prize (Chemistry, 2018) for "“pioneering reticular chemistry via metal-organic frameworks (MOFs) and covalent organic frameworks (COFs).”" David Zilberman (Ph.D. 1979) – 2019 Wolf Prize in Agriculture "for developing economic models that address fundamental issues in agriculture, economics and policymaking"; Professor (holder of the Robinson Chair) in the Agricultural and Resource Economics Department at UC Berkeley (1979-present)
}}

 Breakthrough Prize 

 National Medal of Science 

 National Medal of Technology 
 Chenming Hu, MS, PhD – professor emeritus of EECS at UC Berkeley; 2014 National Medal of Technology and Innovation "for pioneering innovations in microelectronics including reliability technologies, the first industry-standard model for circuit design, and the first 3-dimensional transistors, which radically advanced semiconductor technology" Arthur H. Rosenfeld – professor of physics (1954-2017); 2011 National Medal of Technology and Innovation "for extraordinary leadership in the development of energy-efficient building technologies and related standards and policies"''

 MacArthur Fellowship 
The MacArthur Fellowship is also known as the "Genius Grant"  or "Genius Award".

 Enrico Fermi Award 

 By field 

 Agriculture 
 Irma Adelman (B.S. 1950, Ph.D. 1955) – Professor of Agricultural and Resource Economics

 Anthropology 

 Art and architecture 

 Astronomy 

 Biology 

 Business 

 Chemistry 

 Civil engineering 
 Frank Baron – Professor of Civil Engineering
 William Garrison – Professor Emeritus of Civil and Environmental Engineering
 T. Y. Lin (M.S. 1933) – Professor of Civil Engineering; bridgebuilder
 William J. Oswald (B.E. 1950, M.S. 1951, Ph.D. 1957) – Professor of Civil and Environmental Engineering

 Computer science 

 Economics 

 Education 
 Andrea diSessa – Professor of Education
 Arthur Jensen (B.A. 1945) – Professor Emeritus of Educational Psychology
 Jean Lave – Professor Emerita of Education and Geography
 Elliot Turiel – Professor of Education

 Electrical engineering 

 Ethnic studies 
 Vévé Amasasa Clark (Ph.D. 1983) – Professor of African American Studies
 Evelyn Nakano Glenn (B.A. 1962) – Professor of Ethnic Studies, and Professor of Gender and Women's Studies
 Michael Omi – Associate Professor of Ethnic Studies
 Ronald Takaki (Ph.D. 1967) – Professor Emeritus of Ethnic Studies

 Film studies 
 Kaja Silverman (1940) – Professor of Film Studies and Rhetoric
 Brett Simon (Ph.D. 2003) – Professor of Film Studies
 Linda Williams (B.A. 1969) – Professor of Film Studies

 Foreign languages and culture 

 Geology 
 Walter Alvarez – Professor of Geology
 Garniss Curtis (Ph.D. 1951) – Professor Emeritus of Geology

 Geography 
 Michael J. Watts – Professor of Geography and Development Studies

 History 

 Industrial engineering and Operations Research 
 Stuart Dreyfus – Professor Emeritus of Industrial Engineering and Operations Research
 Ashok Gadgil''' (M.A. 1975, Ph.D. 1979) – Adjunct Professor, Energy and Resources Group
 Ken Goldberg – Professor of Industrial Engineering and Operations Research

Law

Linguistics

Literature and rhetoric

Mathematics

Mechanical engineering 
 Hans Albert Einstein – Professor of Hydraulic Engineering (1947–1970); son of Albert Einstein
 Carlos Fernandez-Pello – Professor of Mechanical Engineering and research scientist in combustion
 Blake R. Van Leer – Professor of Mechanical Engineering 
 Chang-Lin Tien – University Professor (UC system), NEC Distinguished Professor of Engineering, Chancellor of Berkeley campus (1990–1997)

Music

Nuclear engineering 
 Donald R. Olander – Professor of Nuclear Engineering and James Fife Chair in Engineering

Philosophy

Physics

Political science

Psychology

Sociology

See also 
 List of University of California, Berkeley alumni
 :Category:University of California, Berkeley faculty

References 

Berkeley faculty
 
Faculty